Hoss Ellington (May 12, 1935 – May 31, 2014) was a NASCAR driver and team owner. He married Betty Frances Hunt on April 17, 1959 at the Mount Pleasant Methodist Parsonage. They had three daughters: Monica Dale Ellington, Trellace Hunt Ellington and Charla Frances Ellington.  He made 31 starts as a driver between 1968 and 1970 in the Grand National Series, finishing in the top 10 four times, all in 1969. He later became a successful team owner, with five wins, four of them by Donnie Allison and the other one by David Pearson. His team also collected 52 top fives and 92 top ten finishes. He fielded cars for drivers such as Pearson, Fred Lorenzen, Cale Yarborough, A. J. Foyt, Donnie Allison, Kyle Petty, and Dale Jarrett, among others.

Driver years
Born in Raleigh, North Carolina, Ellington made his NASCAR Grand National debut at the 1968 Dixie 500 at Atlanta Motor Speedway while driving his self-owned #61 Mercury; he finished in 31st place after suffering suspension failure after only 80 laps. He competed at two other races that year, at Darlington Raceway and Lowes Motor Speedway, finishing 17th and 34th, respectively. He ended up 61st in points.

In 1969, he made his first start of the season at Rockingham, scoring his first career top ten with a tenth-place finish. He competed in 15 races, finishing in the top ten four times, including two career-best 7th-place finishes. In 1970, he made three more starts, at Charlotte, Darlington, and Rockingham, with a best finish of 13th that year. He then retired as a driver after the 1970 American 500 race in order to focus on being a team owner.

Early years as a team owner
In 1972, Ellington began fielding cars as an owner for Fred Lorenzen. The car was numbered 28. Lorenzen ran seven races with the team. In Lorenzen's first start with the team, at Darlington, he finished 29th due to an engine failure. Lorenzen would later gather two top 5s and 3 top 10s, plus another top 5 finish for Junie Donlavey. Later in the season, Ellington had Cale Yarborough ran three races in the Ellington car, earning two top 10s, and John Sears ran one race for the team, finishing 5th. Between the three drivers, the team competed in 11 races, scoring 3 top 5s and 6 top 10 finishes.

In 1973, Ellington hired Ramo Stott, Charlie Glotzbach, and Gordon Johncock to drive for him, and the team again ran 11 races between the three drivers, but only scored one Top 5 and Top 10, with Johncock finishing fourth at the Firecracker 400 at Daytona. 1974 was much better for the team, with A. J. Foyt, Charlie Glotzbach, Bobby Isaac, and Sam McQuagg splitting up 15 races. Foyt and Glotzbach both scored a single top 5, Isaac finished in the top 10 three times with the team, and McQuagg scored two top tens. The team scored 2 top 5s and 7 top 10s in 15 races.

Racing with Donnie Allison
1975 was when Donnie Allison made his first start with the team. He ran two races with Ellington, finishing third at Talladega in his first race with the team. A. J. Foyt ran seven races with Ellington, scoring an additional top five finish. Glotzbach, Isaac, and Johncock both returned for one race each, but the only top ten was with Glotzbach at Lowes Motor Speedway. The team competed in 12 races, and scored 2 top 5s and 3 top 10s. In 1976, Allison scored Ellington's first win as a team owner at Lowes Motor Speedway in the #1 car, a second team, as A. J. Foyt drove the familiar 28 in that race. Foyt also scored the first pole for the team in that year.

For 1977, Allison was hired as the sole driver for the team, with the main car renumbered #1. Allison repaid Ellington with three pole positions, as well as two wins and 10 top 10s in 17 starts. He finished 24th in points despite running a partial schedule. 1978 was another successful year, with Allison winning at Atlanta and finishing 25th in points, again despite running a part-time schedule. The Atlanta win would be his last career win. Allison did not win at all in 1979, but he became a part of NASCAR history when he and Cale Yarborough crashed while racing for the lead on the last lap of the Daytona 500, when, after the wreck, Allison, Yarborough, and Allison's brother Bobby got into a fistfight in the grass infield in front of what was then the largest televised audience for a NASCAR race.

Later years and end of team
Donnie Allison only drove 3 races for the team in 1980 before he left to join Kennie Childers's team. David Pearson ran 9 races that year, winning once. It was the last win for both Pearson and Ellington's team. in 1981, Buddy Baker drove 15 races, scoring 9 top 10 finishes and Pearson drove 1 race, finishing 8th. Four different drivers (Benny Parsons, Kyle Petty, Buddy Baker, and Donnie Allison) drove for Ellington including Donnie Allison for one race. Of the 14 races the team ran, they only scored 2 top 10 finishes and one pole, all by Buddy Baker. In 1983 and 1984, Lake Speed drove for the team. He ran 18 races in 1983 and 17 in 1984. Overall during Speed's time with Ellington, he scored 4 top 5s and 12 top 10s. Pearson returned for 8 races in 1985. Donnie Allison's nephew Davey ran 3 races, while Rick Wilson and Pancho Carter each ran 1 race. In 1986, Sterling Marlin ran a partial schedule for Ellington scoring 2 top 5s and 4 top 10s, including the Firecracker 400 where he led 6 laps and almost won, coming in second. In 1987, Brett Bodine and Ron Bouchard shared the car, with Bouchard scoring the only top 10 for the team all year. The team's last season was in 1988, when Dale Jarrett drove 8 races for Ellington, with a best finish of 11th and. In the team's last race the season finale at Atlanta, Jarrett qualified 34th but finished 41st after crashing on the fifth lap. The team shut down after attempting to qualify for the 1989 Daytona 500 in an unsponsored Buick with driver Doug Heveron. Unfortunately, a blown engine on lap 1 of the Gatorade 125 Qualifying race forced the team to miss the race.

Ellington died on May 31, 2014 in Wilmington, North Carolina after a lengthy illness.

References

External links

1935 births
2014 deaths
Sportspeople from Wilmington, North Carolina
Racing drivers from North Carolina
NASCAR drivers
NASCAR team owners